Zhu Houren is a Singaporean actor.

Personal life
Zhu was educated at Chung Cheng High School.

In 2003, he made his directorial debut in the telefilm After School, while taking on a role in the same film.

During the Star Awards 2010, Zhu won the Best Supporting Actor award for his role as Liang Zhigao 梁志高, an old man who suffers from senile dementia for the drama Reunion Dinner.

He is married to Vera Hanitijo and has 2 sons, Jonathan, an independent director, and Joel, an actor.

Filmography

Television

Compilation album

Awards and nominations

References

Singaporean people of Chinese descent
Living people
Singaporean male film actors
Singaporean male television actors
Singaporean television personalities
1955 births